Malin Charlotta Wästlund (born 27 April 1964) is a Swedish former long-distance runner. She represented Sweden twice at the IAAF World Women's Road Race Championships, placing fourth in 1987 with a Swedish national record of 49:21 minutes for the 15K run and placing fifth at the 1988 race. She also competed at the 1988 IAAF World Cross Country Championships, finished fifteenth in the women's senior race.

Born in Högsbo, near Gothenburg, she competed for IF Spexarna during her career. She won one national title in her career at the 1987 Swedish Half Marathon Championships. She was also runner-up at the Swedish Cross Country Championships that year. In Swedish cross country competitions, she won the 1987 Tjejmilen and was runner-up there and at the Lidingöloppet in 1989.

International competitions

National titles
Swedish Athletics Championships
Half marathon: 1987

References

External links

1964 births
Living people
Athletes from Gothenburg
Swedish female long-distance runners
Swedish female cross country runners